In 1993 another airline called Air Caribbean appeared.  It was based at Piarco International Airport, Trinidad and Tobago, and used YS-11 aircraft for the first five years.  The airline seemed to be doing reasonably well until the arrival of ageing Boeing 737 aircraft, in July 1998.  These aircraft had fuel-thirsty and noisy JT8D engines, and were a financial burden on the airline.  Air Caribbean intended to use the 737s on flights to Miami International Airport, but the planes were too noisy for American noise regulations.  One of the 737s was so old that a hush kit couldn't be fitted.  As a consequence, the planes had to be grounded whilst the hush-kits were fitted to the suitable aircraft.

In early 2000, Air Caribbean offered slashed air fares to Miami, in order to compete with BWIA and American Airlines.  This was a financial disaster, as passengers chose to fly with competing airlines who offered modern aircraft.  On October 23, 2000, Air Caribbean was closed down, with massive debts.  The 737s have since been scrapped in America, and one YS-11 is still at Piarco International Airport, in an abandoned state.

Destinations
Barbados
Grantley Adams International Airport
Grenada
Maurice Bishop International Airport
Guyana
Cheddi Jagan International Airport
Trinidad and Tobago
Piarco International Airport
Arthur Napoleon Raymond Robinson International Airport
United States
Miami International Airport

Fleet

The Airline operated a fleet of six NAMC YS-11's and two Boeing 737-200 aircraft.

References

External links

Airlines established in 1993
Defunct airlines of Trinidad and Tobago
Airlines disestablished in 2000